Jesus & Mary Academy, is a private secondary school at Laheriasarai, Darbhanga. Jesus & Mary Academy is affiliated with the Central Board of Secondary Education based in Darbhanga.

See also
 Darbhanga
 Madhubani

References

Education in Darbhanga
Educational institutions established in 1996
Christian schools in Bihar
1996 establishments in Bihar